Trichocerota is a genus of moths in the family Sesiidae.

Species
Trichocerota alectra (Arita & Gorbunov, 1995)
Trichocerota antigama Meyrick, 1926
Trichocerota brachythyra Hampson, 1919
Trichocerota cupreipennis (Walker, [1865])
Trichocerota diplotima Meyrick, 1926
Trichocerota formosana Arita & Gorbunov, 2002
Trichocerota fulvistriga Hampson, 1919
Trichocerota intervenata Hampson, 1919
Trichocerota melli Kallies & Arita, 2001
Trichocerota proxima Le Cerf, 1916
Trichocerota radians Hampson, 1919
Trichocerota rubripectus (Xu & Liu, 1993)
Trichocerota ruficincta Hampson, [1893a]
Trichocerota spilogastra (Le Cerf, 1916b)
Trichocerota tianpingensis (Xu & Liu, 1993)
Trichocerota univitta Hampson, 1900

References

Sesiidae